Steve Chassey (born February 27, 1945 in Brockton, Massachusetts), is a former driver in the CART Championship Car series.  He raced in 9 seasons (1981, 1983–1989, and 1992), with 44 career starts, including the Indianapolis 500 in 1983, 1987, and 1988.  He finished in the top ten 4 times, with his best finish in 5th position in 1981 at Watkins Glen International. He raced his last Indy 500 in 1988 for Gary Trout Motorsports finishing 24th.

Chassey was also a regular competitor in the USAC Silver Crown Series championship, racing from 1975 to 1992. He was runner-up in the 1980 season, and had two career wins, at the 1984 Hoosier Hundred and 1988 Tony Bettenhausen 100.  After retiring from driving, he also worked for ESPN, commentating on Thursday night "Thunder" USAC events.

American open–wheel racing results

(key)

PPG Indycar Series

(key) (Races in bold indicate pole position)

Indy 500 results

References

External links
Driver DB Profile

1945 births
Champ Car drivers
Indianapolis 500 drivers
Living people
People from Hamilton County, Indiana
Racing drivers from Indiana
Sportspeople from Brockton, Massachusetts
USAC Silver Crown Series drivers
Bettenhausen Racing drivers
EuroInternational drivers